Chugunov Glacier is a glacier about  long located just north of Astakhov Glacier in the Bowers Mountains, a major mountain range situated within Victoria Land, Antarctica. It is one of several glaciers which drain the eastern slopes of the Explorers Range and flow to Ob' Bay. It was plotted from photographs taken by the Soviet Antarctic Expedition in 1958, and named for N.A. Chugunov, a Soviet aerologist who perished while taking part in this expedition. The geographical feature lies situated on the Pennell Coast, a portion of Antarctica lying between Cape Williams and Cape Adare.

References 

Glaciers of Pennell Coast